Maria do Carmo Estanislau do Amaral (born 1959) is a Brazilian botanist, biologist, curator, and academic., who has worked, since 2011, on teaching and research in the Department of Biology, Universidad Estatal de Campinas.

Biography
In 1980, she obtained a Bachelor of Biological Sciences from the University of São Paulo, and in 1985, a Master in Biological Sciences (Botany) from the same institution, defending the thesis supervised by Dr. Antonio Salatino, Epicuticular wax of aquatic plants. In 1990, she obtained a PhD in Natural Sciences from the Universität Hamburg, Germany.

Since 1993 she has been a professor at the Universidad Estatal de Campinas. She works in botany, with an emphasis on seed plant taxonomy, researching the following topics: phylogenetic systematics, macromolecular systematics, interactive multiple access keys, Ochnaceae, Commelinaceae, Orchidaceae, aquatic plants, and the flora of São Paulo.

In 2012, she worked on post-doctorate research at the Universität Zürich, with a grant from the Fundação de Amparo à Pesquisa do Estado de São Paulo, FAPESP, Brazil.

Selected publications
Some of her most cited publications are:

<small>
MCE Amaral, 1991, Phylogenetische systematik der Ochnaceae, Bot. Jahrb. Syst 113 (1), 105-196
AM Giulietti, MCE Amaral, V Bittrich, 1995, Phylogenetic analysis of inter-and infrageneric relationships of Leiothrix Ruhland (Eriocaulaceae), Kew Bulletin, 55-71
V Bittrich, MCE Amaral, 1996, Flower morphology and pollination biology of some Clusia species from the Gran Sabana (Venezuela), Kew Bulletin, 681-694
V Bittrich, MCE Amaral, 1996, Pollination biology of Symphonia globulifera (Clusiaceae), Plant Systematics and Evolution 200 (1-2), 101-110
V Bittrich, MCE Amaral, 1997, Floral biology of some Clusia species from Central Amazonia, Kew Bulletin, 617-635
ALM Porto, SMF Machado, CMA de Oliveira, V Bittrich, ..., 2000, Polyisoprenylated benzophenones from Clusia floral resins, Phytochemistry 55 (7), 755-768
MG Reis, AD Faria, V Bittrich, MCE Amaral, AJ Marsaioli, 2000, The chemistry of flower rewards—Oncidium (Orchidaceae), Journal of the Brazilian Chemical Society 11 (6), 600-608
MG Reis, AD de Faria, MCE do Amaral, AJ Marsaioli, 2003, Oncidinol—a novel diacylglycerol from Ornithophora radicans Barb. Rodr.(Orchidaceae) floral oil, Tetrahedron Letters 44 (46), 8519-8523
A Flach, RC Dondon, RB Singer, S Koehler, EA Maria do Carmo, ..., 2004, The chemistry of pollination in selected Brazilian Maxillariinae orchids: floral rewards and fragrance, Journal of Chemical Ecology 30 (5), 1045-1056
RB Singer, A Flach, S Koehler, AJ Marsaioli, MCE Amaral, 2004, Sexual mimicry in Mormolyca ringens (Lindl.) Schltr.(Orchidaceae: Maxillariinae), Annals of Botany 93 (6), 755-762
MCE Do Amaral, E Hardy, EM Hebling, A Faúndes, 2005, Menstruation and amenorrhea: opinion of Brazilian women, Contraception 72 (2), 157-161
A Ruiz, EG Magalhães, AF Magalhães, AD Faria, MCE Amaral, ..., 2005, Avaliação da atividade tóxica em Artemia salina e Biomphalaria glabrata de extratos de quatro espécies do gênero Eleocharis (Cyperaceae), Revista Brasileira de Farmacognosia 15 (2), 98-102
A Flach, AJ Marsaioli, RB Singer, EA Maria Do Carmo, C Menezes, ..., 2006, Pollination by Sexual Mimicry in Mormolyca ringens: A Floral Chemistry that Remarkably Matches the Pheromones of Virgin Queens of Scaptotrigona sp., Journal of Chemical Ecology 32 (1), 59-70
MG Reis, AD de Faria, IA Dos Santos, EA Maria do Carmo, AJ Marsaioli, 2007, Byrsonic acid—the clue to floral mimicry involving oil-producing flowers and oil-collecting bees, Journal of chemical ecology 33 (7), 1421-1429
MCE Amaral, 2008, Guia de campo para plantas aquáticas e palustres do Estado de São Paulo, Holos Editora
ER Pansarin, MCE Amaral, 2008, Reproductive biology and pollination mechanisms of Epidendrum secundum (Orchidaceae). Floral variation: a consequence of natural hybridization?, Plant Biology 10 (2), 211-219
MW Chase, NH Williams, AD de Faria, KM Neubig, MCE Amaral, ...., 2009, Floral convergence in Oncidiinae (Cymbidieae; Orchidaceae): an expanded concept of Gomesa and a new genus Nohawilliamsia, Annals of Botany 104 (3), 387-402
ER Pansarin, MCE do Amaral, 2009, Reproductive biology and pollination of southeastern Brazilian Stanhopea Frost ex Hook.(Orchidaceae), Flora-Morphology, Distribution, Functional Ecology of Plants 204 (3), 238-249
DC Zappi, FLR Filardi, P Leitman, VC Souza, BMT Walter, JR Pirani, ..., 2015, Growing knowledge: an overview of seed plant diversity in Brazil, Rodriguésia 66 (4), 1085-1113
FLR Filardi, F Barros, JFA Baumgratz, CEM Bicudo, TB Cavalcanti, ..., 2018, Brazilian Flora 2020: innovation and collaboration to meet Target 1 of the Global Strategy for Plant Conservation (GSPC), Rodriguésia 69 (4), 1513-1527

Memberships 
 Sociedad Botánica de Brasil

Periodical reviewer 
 2010–present: Phytotaxa (online)
 2009–present: Novon (Saint Louis, Mo.)
 2010–present: Brittonia (Bronx, N.Y.)
 2010–present: Revista Brasileira de Botânica (print)
 2011–present: Rodriguésia (print)
 2011–present: Acta Botanica Brasilica (print)
 2012–present: Botanical Journal of the Linnean Society (print)
 2016–present: F.R.L.M.S.S.

Research Projects Supervisor 
 2000–present: Conselho Nacional de Desenvolvimento Científico e Tecnológico
 1995–present: Fundação de Amparo à Pesquisa do Estado de São Paulo
 2008–present: Deutscher Akademischer Austauschdienst
 2007–present: Fundação de Amparo à Pesquisa do Estado da Bahia
 2000–present: Serviço de Apoio ao Estudante - UNICAMP

Notes

References

1959 births
Living people
20th-century Brazilian botanists
People from São Paulo
People from Capivari
University of São Paulo alumni
University of Hamburg alumni
21st-century Brazilian botanists